The Skochinsky coal mine (A.A. Skochinsky Mine) is a large coal mine located in the city of Donetsk, in the south-east of Ukraine (as of 2017, in the de facto Donetsk People's Republic). It is named after the Alexander A. Skochinsky (Александр Александрович Скочинский, 1874—1960), a Soviet mining engineer and researcher.

The Skochinsky Mine represents one of the largest coal reserves in Ukraine, having estimated reserves of 144.4 million tonnes. The annual coal production is around 776,000 tonnes.

Skochinsky Mine is one of the deepest coal mines in the country, where mining is carried out at the depths of up to 1200—1450 m.

See also 

 Coal in Ukraine
 List of mines in Ukraine

References 

Coal mines in Ukraine
Economy of Donetsk Oblast
Coal mines in the Soviet Union